Raipole is a village in Ranga Reddy district in Telangana, India. It falls under Ibrahimpatnam mandal.

References

Villages in Ranga Reddy district